Float On may refer to:

 "Float On" (The Floaters song), 1977
 "Float On" (Modest Mouse song), 2004
 "Float On", a song by Danny Brown from his 2013 album Old
 "Float On", a song by Dream Warriors from their 1996 album The Master Plan